The Râșca is a right tributary of the river Moldova in Romania. It discharges into the Moldova near Ungheni. Its former upper course, the Râșca, discharges into the Moldova further upstream.

References

Rivers of Romania
Rivers of Neamț County